Alice Mann may refer to:
 Alice Mann (actress)
 Alice Mann (politician)
 Alice Mann (printer)